The Constitution of the State of Guanajuato is the document that describes the structure and function of the government of the State of Guanajuato.   The 1917 constitution, which took effect in September, 1917, is the current constitution of Guanajuato.

Guanajuato